Wind is a 1992 film directed by Carroll Ballard and starring Matthew Modine, Jennifer Grey and Cliff Robertson.

Plot 

The film is centered on the America's Cup series of yachting races and uses them as a backdrop for both an action/adventure and a romantic storyline.

Cup events depicted in the film

A host of events that occurred in the 1987 America's Cup held off Fremantle Australia were translated into film and presented as events occurring to the characters in the movie, including the following:
 Will Parker striking the buoy while rounding the final mark was taken from Chris Dickson's final race against Stars & Stripes 87 in the Louis Vuitton Cup Finals. Kiwi Magic was just six seconds back of Dennis Conner's boat when Dickson made his only major mistake of the summer, striking the buoy while rounding the final mark. He was obliged to re-round, ending all hope of catching Stars & Stripes 87.
 Jack Neville spearing the "Whomper" was taken from the Defender Semifinals, when Australia IV introduced a new sail they called the 'gennaker', an enormous asymmetrical hybrid that pulled Australia IV even with the leading Kookaburra II. As the Bond team came up, Peter Gilmour luffed hard, spearing Australia IV's gennaker and splitting it in two.
 The broken mast of the Platypus occurred to Challenge France in the middle of the third and final challenger rounds robins. Challenge France was unable to continue in the regatta.
 The boat collision occurred in the Defender series, when Australia IV struck Peter Gilmour's Kookaburra II.
 The protests and media briefings occurred multiple times throughout the regatta, and at times were quite contentious.
Stellan Skarsgård's character is based on Burt Rutan, who constructed a wing sail for Dennis Conner's 1988 catamaran “Stars & Stripes”.

Cast 
Matthew Modine as Will Parker
Jennifer Grey as Kate Bass
Cliff Robertson as Morgan Weld
Jack Thompson as Jack Neville
Stellan Skarsgård as Joe Heiser
Rebecca Miller as Abigail Weld
Ned Vaughn as Charley Moore

Production 
The film was inspired by the New York Yacht Club's loss of the 1983 America's Cup through the events of the 1987 America's Cup. Several of the 12-metre class yachts that participated in Cup races were used in the movie.

"Wind" contains some of the best, most realistic, on deck big-boat sailing sequences ever portrayed. America's Cup skipper Peter Gilmour, whose aggressive sailing during the 1987 defender selection series earned himself a place on the defender boat for the America's Cup, was "Sailing Master" for the film. He was on board for all of the sailing sequences, controlled the boat while they were flying the "Whomper", and can be seen in many of the boat scenes, surreptitiously laying a hand on the opposite wheel.  Lisa Blackaller, daughter of America's Cup skipper Tom Blackaller, acted as sailing double for Jennifer Grey for the small boat races in the International 14 class at Newport.

American Eagle (US 21), the red  12 Meter ocean endurance champion sailed to fame by Ted Turner in the mid-seventies, was used as the trial horse sailed by Will Parker in preparation for the America's Cup. The boat had been a finalist in the 1964 Defender selection series but lost the selection to Constellation.  The 12-meter yachts depicting the America's Cup races were the more modern boats from the America II Syndicate, America II (US 42) and America II (US 46). The boat repainted as Boomerang and later as Platypus was depicted by US 42, and Radiance and then later Geronimo were depicted by US 46. US 46 had been sailed by John Kolius in the 1987 Louis Vuitton Challenger Selection Cup races.

Many of the film's port scenes were filmed on location in and around Newport, Rhode Island, with the sailing scenes of the International 14's competition and the America's Cup races filmed off Perth in Western Australia. Parts of the film were also shot in Green River, Wendover, and the Bonneville Salt Flats in Utah. Shooting took twelve weeks, beginning on 25 February 1991.

New Zealand's long time America's Cup commentator Peter Montgomery also lent his voice to the simulated television coverage of all Cup races in the film.

Soundtrack 

The soundtrack is available on CD from BSX Records. The score was composed by Basil Poledouris. Also included on the same CD is the Soundtrack to the 1981 television movie A Whale for the Killing, also composed by Poledouris.

Reception
Wind holds a 50% rating on Rotten Tomatoes, based on 12 reviews, and an average rating of 6/10.

Box office
Wind grossed $96,798 at the box office in Australia. The movie flopped at the US box office.

See also
Cinema of Australia

References

External links

Wind at Oz Movies

 Sailors prospective from Scuttlebutt on the movie production
 Review in the Washington Post by Desson Howe - September 1992
 Review in the Chicago Sun-Times BY ROGER EBERT - September 1992

1992 films
1992 independent films
1992 romantic drama films
1990s sports films
1987 America's Cup
American independent films
American romantic drama films
American sports drama films
American Zoetrope films
America's Cup
Competitive sailing films
1990s English-language films
Films directed by Carroll Ballard
Films scored by Basil Poledouris
Films shot in Australia
Films shot in Rhode Island
Films shot in Utah
Sports films based on actual events
TriStar Pictures films
1990s American films